Honsading (also, Aknutl, Hoonselton, Hoonsolton, Hun-sa-tung, Loonsolton, Oka-no, and Okahno) is a former Hupa settlement in Humboldt County, California. It was located on right bank of the Trinity River near Hupa Valley; its precise location is unknown.

References

Former settlements in Humboldt County, California
Former Native American populated places in California
Hupa villages
Lost Native American populated places in the United States